Anycall was a South Korean mobile phone brand established by Samsung Electronics in 1993. Like other mobile phone brands in South Korea, they provide technology such as cameras, internet access, and digital TV through Digital Multimedia Broadcasting.

Samsung mobile phones were sold through the Anycall brand in South Korea and the greater China region prior to 2011.

Spokeswoman
Lee Hyori was spokeswoman for Anycall from 2003 During this period, she starred in Anycall produced music videos such as "Anymotion", which features Anycall SCH-V600 by Lee Hyori Phone. In 2005, Hyori Lee starred in "Anyclub", a follow up to the smash hit "Anymotion". In December 2006, she starred in a third installment, labeled "Anystar".
The first music video starred Lee Hyori along with Eric Mun, while the second and third installment starred Kwon Sang-woo and Lee Joon-gi respectively.

Since the expiration of Hyori's contract with Samsung in November 2007, K-pop stars such as BoA, Kim Junsu, Tablo, and Jin Bora collaborated to produce "Anyband", which featured three combined music videos for songs "Talk, Play Love", "Promise U", and "Day Dream" in a seven-minute commercial. The temporary band also held concerts for fans.

In 2008 k-pop groups DBSK & Girls' Generation collaborated from one music video to promote Samsung Anycall Haptic.

In 2009 Shinee released digital single "Bodyguard" to promote the cell phone. The music video and CF for the song featured the popular on-screen couple So Yi-jung (Kim Bum) and Chu Ga-eul (Kim So-eun) from the popular KBS romantic drama series Boys Over Flowers. The same year Son Dam-bi and girl group After School teamed up for the digital single Amoled. After School will soon replace Son Dambi as the new spokes models for the brand.

A South Korean girl group Miss A released in 2010 their song "Love Again", whose music video promoted the Samsung Beat Festival. The video also prominently featured an Anycall phone.
 
In 2011 IU (kpop singer) became the spokeswoman

Spokespersons
Lee Hyori (longest full year exclusive contract model)
Kim Hyun-joong
Go Ara
Jung Il-woo
Lee Joon-gi
Jun Ji-hyun
Lee Seo-jin
Lee Seaou-loung
Yoon So-yi
Cha Tae-hyun
Jang Hyuk
Lee Na-young
Moon Geun-young (licensed by KTF)
Ahn Sung-ki (licensed by KTF)
Park Jung-ah
Choi Soo-young
Seven (licensed by LG Telecom)
Eric, member of Shinhwa)
Han Sang-woo Mindy's own
Kwon Sang-woo
Anyband (formed by Samsung Anycall itself): BoA, Kim Junsu of TVXQ, Tablo of Epik High and jazz pianist Jin Bora
Rain
Victoria Song
TVXQ and Girls' Generation (Haptic Motion CF)
Kim Bum, Kim So-eun, and SHINee (Bodyguard CF)
Kim Joon
Kim Hyun-joong
Son Dam-bi and After School (Amoled CF)
Lee Min-ho
UEE of After School
Yuna Kim (Yuna's Haptic)
4Tomorrow (Tomorrow CF)
2PM (Corby and NORi F CF)
2NE1(Corby F and NORi CF)
Narsha (Anycall Live CF)
Kim Tae-woo (Anycall Live CF)
Jung So-min (Playful Kiss)
IU (singer)

Related companies
SK Telecom
KT
LG U+
Cyon
SK Teletech
Motorola
Pantech Curitel
VK Mobile
KTF Ever

External links

Samsung Electronics Homepage of Anycall Division 
Anycall Homepage 
Samsung Mobilephone Global Homepages
Samsungs Brand New Innovation
Samsung Mobile Hong Kong Homepage 
Samsung Mobile Taiwan Homepage(Traditional Chinese) 
Samsung Mobile China Homepage (Simplified Chinese)

Anycall
South Korean brands